Xue Qinghao (born 26 September 2000) is a Chinese footballer currently playing as a goalkeeper for Shanghai Shenhua.

Career statistics

Club
.

References

2000 births
Living people
Chinese footballers
Association football goalkeepers
Chinese Super League players
Liaoning F.C. players
Dalian Professional F.C. players
Shanghai Shenhua F.C. players